Dangerous Lady is a 1941 American crime film directed by Bernard B. Ray and written by Jack Natteford. The film stars Neil Hamilton, June Storey, Douglas Fowley, Evelyn Brent, Greta Granstedt and Malcolm "Bud" McTaggart. It was released on September 12, 1941 by Producers Releasing Corporation.

Plot
Detective Duke Martindel and his wife Phyllis work together to clear a girl falsely convicted of having murdered a judge. The case goes stale when two people who knew the truth are murdered. Duke and Phyllis then become prisoners of the real murderers, and the case is solved.

Cast      
Neil Hamilton as Duke Martindel
June Storey as Phyllis Martindel
Douglas Fowley as Sergeant Brent
Evelyn Brent as Hester Engel
Greta Granstedt as Leila Bostwick
Malcolm 'Bud' McTaggart as Joe Link 
Jack Mulhall as Jones 
John Holland as Guy Kisling
Emmett Vogan as Dr. Grayson
Terry Walker as Annie Lowell
Kenneth Harlan as Det. Dunlap
Carl Stockdale as Judge Harding
John Ince as Capt. Newton
Sheila Darcy as Reporter
Jimmy Aubrey as Janitor

References

External links
 

1941 films
American crime films
1941 crime films
Producers Releasing Corporation films
Films directed by Bernard B. Ray
American black-and-white films
1940s English-language films
1940s American films